was a Japanese music duo active from 1999 to 2003. The duo consisted of 2 childhood friends, forming the group in their 3rd year of high school. Their first mini-album and single were released on indies labels, Cafe au Label and DNA CAPSULES. Their second single with Pony Canyon became their major debut and a nationwide hit. Their last single, with King Records, was used an ending theme for the anime The Prince of Tennis.

Singles 
 (2000.07.27) "" (Heartbeat)
 (2000.11.22) "" (Red Apple)
 (2001.02.07) "" (Winter Sky)
 (2001.08.10) "" (Move On)
 (2001.12.05) "" (Promise)
 (2002.05.15) "" (Wind is Raging)
 (2003.05.21) "" (Wind Traveler)

Albums 
 (1999.09.21) "" (Location of Passion)
 (2001.03.07) "" (Intriguing Person)
 (2002.07.17) "" (After the Rain)

External links 
 Profile at Pony Records 
 BARKS Profile 
 Oricon Profile 

Japanese musical groups